Danny Gorrer (born June 1, 1986) is a former American football cornerback. He was signed by the New Orleans Saints as an undrafted free agent in 2009. He played college football at Texas A&M. Gorrer was also a member of the St. Louis Rams, Baltimore Ravens, Seattle Seahawks, Tampa Bay Buccaneers, and Detroit Lions.

Early years
He starred at Memorial High School in Port Arthur, Texas, where he recorded 68 tackles, 9 interceptions and 2 touchdowns as a senior and was selected to the Associated Press All-State second-team. Was named first-team All-Greater Houston Area, first-team Port Arthur News Super Teams, first-team Beaumont Enterprise Super Gold Team, and first-team All-District. Won the 2003 5A state championship 4x400-meter relay as a senior and finished second in the state his junior and senior year in the 4x100-meter relay.
Gorrer was a high school teammate, and is a life long friend of fellow NFL player, Jamaal Charles.

College career
A two-year starter at Texas A&M, Gorrer started 24 of the 42 games he played for the Aggies, tallying 141 tackles, two sacks, an interception, 13 pass defenses and two forced fumbles. He appeared in 11 games as senior, starting 4 of them and making 29 tackles. Started his first seven games and made 30 tackles as junior before injuring his knee. Had his best collegiate season as a sophomore, notching 52 tackles, an interception, and starting all 13 games. Saw action in all 11 games (4 starts) as a redshirt freshman, posting 30 tackles. Redshirted as a true freshman in 2004. Graduated with a degree in agricultural leadership and development in December 2008.

Professional career

First stint with New Orleans Saints
Danny Gorrer was signed as an undrafted free agent by the New Orleans Saints in the 2009 offseason. He was released, however.

St. Louis Rams
Danny Gorrer was claimed off waivers by the St. Louis Rams in 2009. He started one game for St. Louis in the 2009 NFL season and recorded five tackles on the year. But that would be his only season playing for the Rams. Gorrer was cut shortly afterward.

Second stint with Saints
New Orleans re-claimed Danny Gorrer in June 2010 after he was waived by the St. Louis Rams.  The Saints waived him on August 24, 2010.

Baltimore Ravens

He was signed to the Baltimore Ravens' practice squad on September 23, 2010. He was released on October 7, but was re-signed on October 8. On September 17, 2011, Gorrer was moved to the Ravens' active roster. He saw a fair amount of playing time in a Sunday Night Football win over the New York Jets, shutting down former Super Bowl MVP Santonio Holmes for much of the game.
However, the Ravens released Gorrer prior to the start of the 2012 season.

Seattle Seahawks
On September 18, 2012, he was signed by the Seattle Seahawks, who subsequently waived him on October 30, 2012.  He received no playing time while with the team.

Tampa Bay Buccaneers
On October 31, 2012, the Tampa Bay Buccaneers claimed Gorrer off waivers. He was released on August 27, 2014.

Detroit Lions
On September 16, 2014, the Detroit Lions signed Gorrer to bolster a secondary depleted by injuries. He was waived on November 3, 2014.

Second stint with the Baltimore Ravens
Gorrer was signed off waivers by the Baltimore Ravens on November 4, 2014. In his first game back to the Ravens, Gorrer picked off a pass from Titans QB Zach Mettenberger.

References

External links

Tampa Bay Buccaneers bio

1986 births
Living people
Sportspeople from Port Arthur, Texas
Players of American football from Texas
American football cornerbacks
Texas A&M Aggies football players
New Orleans Saints players
St. Louis Rams players
Baltimore Ravens players
Seattle Seahawks players
Tampa Bay Buccaneers players
Detroit Lions players